Anqi Luo (born August 26, 1996) is a table tennis player competing for Canada. She won a bronze medal in the women's doubles with Zhang Mo at the 2014 Commonwealth Games in Glasgow.

References

Living people
Table tennis players at the 2014 Commonwealth Games
Commonwealth Games bronze medallists for Canada
Canadian female table tennis players
1996 births
Canadian people of Chinese descent
Table tennis players at the 2011 Pan American Games
Table tennis players at the 2014 Summer Youth Olympics
Commonwealth Games medallists in table tennis
Pan American Games medalists in table tennis
Pan American Games bronze medalists for Canada
Table tennis players from Guangdong
People from Foshan
Naturalised table tennis players
Medalists at the 2015 Pan American Games
Table tennis players at the 2015 Pan American Games
Medallists at the 2014 Commonwealth Games